In molecular biology, the kinase binding protein CGI-121 family of proteins includes the kinase binding protein CGI-121 and its homologues. CGI-121 has been shown to bind to the p53-related protein kinase (PRPK). CGI-121 is part of a conserved protein complex, KEOPS. The KEOPS complex is involved in telomere uncapping and telomere elongation. This family of proteins also include archaeal homologues.

References

Protein domains
Telomeres
Telomere-related proteins